Still So Far to Go: The Best of Chris Rea is a compilation album by British singer-songwriter Chris Rea, released by Rhino Records in 2009. The album reached number 8 on the UK Albums Chart, making it Rea's first entry in the top 10 in ten years since The Blue Cafe (1998), and was certified Gold by BPI in 2013.

Track listing
All tracks written by Chris Rea.

Disc one
"Fool (If You Think It's Over)" – 4:07
"On the Beach" – 3:46
"Let's Dance" – 4:17
"Diamonds" – 4:11
"Loving You" – 3:48
"I Can Hear Your Heartbeat" – 3:26
"I Don't Know What It Is But I Love It" – 3:37
"Stainsby Girls" – 4:08
"Josephine" – 4:36
"It's All Gone" – 4:11
"Loving You Again" – 4:27
"Joys of Christmas" – 5:05
"Driving Home for Christmas" – 4:02
"Working on It" – 4:27
"Tell Me There's a Heaven" – 6:03
"Heaven" – 4:12
"Looking for the Summer" – 5:06
"Come So Far, Yet Still So Far to Go" – 4:14

Disc two
"The Road to Hell (Part 2)" – 4:33
"Auberge" – 4:43
"Winter Song" – 4:37
"Nothing to Fear" – 4:30
"God's Great Banana Skin" – 5:21
"Julia" – 3:57
"You Can Go Your Own Way" – 3:59
"When the Grey Sky Turns to Blue" – 3:44
"The Blue Cafe" – 4:02
"New Times Square" – 4:01
"Stony Road" – 5:32
"Easy Rider" – 4:50
"Blue Street" – 7:09
"Somewhere Between Highway 61 & 49" – 6:09
"The Shadow of a Fool" – 3:58
"Valentino" – 4:30

Charts

Certifications

References

2009 greatest hits albums
Chris Rea compilation albums
Rhino Records compilation albums